Zinc finger protein PLAGL2 is a protein that in humans is encoded by the PLAGL2 gene.

Zinc finger protein PLAGL2 is a zinc finger protein that recognizes DNA and/or RNA.

The gene has seen in gliomas to suppress cellular differentiation and thus encourage cells to become more stem cell like. Such plasticity is seen in glioma cells, together with the ignorance to differentiation factors.

References

Further reading